Alexandros "Alexis" Spyridonidis (Greek: Αλέξανδρος "Αλέξης" Σπυριδωνίδης; born February 3, 1995) is a Greek professional basketball player for ASK Karditsa of the Greek A2 Basket League.

Professional career
Spyridonidis began his professional career with the Greek Basket League club Ilysiakos in 2012. In 2013, he signed a four-year contract with KAOD. After the team's relegation to the third division, Spyridonidis moved again to Nea Kifissia.

On September 9, 2016, he joined Koroivos Amaliadas of the Greek Basket League. After spending two years with Koroivos and due to the team's relegation, Spyridonidis left the club and joined the newly promoted to the Greek Basket League club Holargos.

Spyridonidis spent the 2019-20 season with Rethymno Cretan Kings, averaging 1.9 points per game. On October 11, 2020, he joined for Bisons Loimaa of the Finnish Koripallon I-divisioona. With Bisons, he won the Koripallon I-divisioona championship.

Greek national team
With the junior national teams of Greece, Spyridonidis played at the following tournaments: the 2011 FIBA Europe Under-16 Championship, the 2013 FIBA Europe Under-18 Championship and the 2014 FIBA Europe Under-20 Championship.

References

External links
FIBA Profile
Greek Basket League Profile ]
Eurobasket.com Profile
RealGM.com Profile
Basketball-Reference.com Profile

1995 births
Living people
Greek men's basketball players
Holargos B.C. players
Ilysiakos B.C. players
CB Clavijo players
K.A.O.D. B.C. players
Koroivos B.C. players
Nea Kifissia B.C. players
Point guards
Basketball players from Piraeus